William Tribell may refer to:

 William S. Tribell (born 1977), American poet
 William Todd Tribell (born 1968), American businessman